Mycena aetites, commonly known as the drab bonnet, is a species of mushroom in the family Mycenaceae. First described as Agaricus aetites by Swedish mycologist Elias Magnus Fries in 1838, it was assigned its current name in 1872 by Lucien Quélet. This rare mushroom is found in Europe.

Description
The cap is a grey-brown color that is somewhat darker in the center. The stipe of M. aetites has a pruinose apex and isglabrous below. The mushrooms has an raphanoid odour.

A similar species is Mycena abramsii. This species usually grows on woods and have cheilocystidia with a clear acute-neck.

Ecology
Mycena aetites grows on decayed wood and woody debris in temperate ecosystems.

Edibility
Mycena aetites is considered inedible. It has an indistinct taste, and a faint odor of radish.

References

aetites
Fungi of Europe
Fungi described in 1838
Taxa named by Elias Magnus Fries